Waysted were a British heavy metal band, formed by former UFO bassist Pete Way and the Scottish rocker Fin Muir (Ian Muir) in 1982. Recruiting Frank Noon (formerly with Def Leppard), Ronnie Kayfield and Paul Raymond, Waysted signed to Chrysalis Records and released Vices in 1983.

The band has gone through multiple line up changes over the years, with members leaving, rejoining and leaving again, as well as periods of complete dormancy while Way pursued other projects. The band then split up in 1987, but then reformed in 2003.

In 2008, Waysted were touring the UK in support of their new album The Harsh Reality. However, the outfit has not released any new material since that time.

Way died on 14 August 2020 from injuries sustained in an accident.

Band members

Current members
 Pete Way – bass guitar (1982–1987; 2003–2020; died 2020)
 Fin Muir – vocals (1982–1985; 2003–2020)
 Chris George – guitar (2004–2020)
 Paul "RD" Haslin – drums (2003–2020)
 Jason Poole – guitar (2007–2020)

Former members
 Neil Wilkinson – guitar (2007)
 Danny Vaughn – vocals, tambourine (1985–1987)
 Johnny Dee – drums (1985–1987)
 Jimmy DiLella – keyboards, piano, guitar (1985–1987)
 Paul Raymond – keyboards, guitar (1982–1984)
 Ron E. Kayfield – guitar (1982–1983)
 Frank Noon – drums (1982–1984)
 Barry Bennedetta – guitar (1984)
 Decca Wade – drums (1984)
 Neil Shepard – guitar (1984)
 Andy Parker – drums (1984–1985)
 Paul Chapman – guitar (1984–1987; 2003–2004)
 Phil "Philthy Animal" Taylor – drums (1985)
 Jerry Shirley – drums (1985)
 Martin Chaisson – guitar (1987)
 Eric Gamens – guitar (1987)
 Jon Deverill – vocals (1987)
 Steve Harris – bass (1987 live guest member only)
 Joey Belladonna – vocals (1987 live guest member only)

Timeline

Discography

Studio albums
 Vices (1983) No. 78 UK
 The Good the Bad the Waysted (1985)
 Save Your Prayers (1986) No. 185 US
 Wilderness of Mirrors (2000) - Includes the Original Recordings from the 'Save Your Prayers' Sessions remixed by Paul Chapman with one bonus track. 
 Back from the Dead (2004)
 The Harsh Reality (2007)

Live albums
 You Won't Get Out Alive (2000) - Live, St David's Hall, Cardiff, 1984

Compilation albums
 Totally Waysted (2008)

Extended plays
 Waysted (1984) No. 73 UK

References

External links
 Myspace.com

British heavy metal musical groups
Musical groups established in 1982
1982 establishments in the United Kingdom
Chrysalis Records artists
Musical groups disestablished in 2020